Jamie Davies (born 16 February 1974, in Yeovil) is a British racing driver.

Career

Single-seaters
Davies began his career competing in karting, winning the South West Championship in 1988, the British Junior Championship in 1989 and the British Junior Open Championship in 1990. He started his circuit racing career driving in the Formula Vauxhall Junior Championship in 1992, winning numerous races before moving up to the Formula Vauxhall Lotus Championship for the 1993 and 1994 seasons. Finishing runner-up in 1994 with five wins (one European round). He also won the McLaren Autosport BRDC Award in that year, which earned him a prize test with the McLaren Formula One team. He raced in the British Formula Three Championship in 1995 and 1996, winning two races and leading the championship before a different engine supplier was used by TWR halting his Championship campaign. He moved to the International Formula 3000 Championship in 1997, in which he raced for three seasons. After leading the championship with four podiums including one win during his rookie season, Davies ended the 97 Championship in fourth position. The following two seasons contained flashes of speed including podiums at Oschersleben and Monaco but never quite the repeat success of his rookie year. 1998 also saw Davies return to the McLaren Formula One team for more testing duties. Davies guest appeared in the 2000 International Formula 3000 Championship at Monaco where he qualified in fourth position and finished the race second overall.

British Touring Car Championship

He was due to race in the Snetterton rounds of the 1996 British Touring Car Championship in place of the injured Kelvin Burt at Volvo but a crash at the pre-meeting test ruled him out. He also tested a Production Class BMW 320i E46 for Edenbridge ahead of the 2002 Season but lost out on a potential race seat at the team to Norman Simon.

Sports cars
Davies raced for Panoz at the Daytona 24 Hours, Sebring 12 Hours and the 24 Hours of Le Mans in 1998 and the 24 Hours of Le Mans in 2001. For 2002 he moved to the British GT Championship, in which he won the GTO class. In 2003 he competed in the FIA GT Championship and also won his class at the 24 Hours of Le Mans at the wheel of a Prodrive 550 GTS Ferrari. In 2004 he finished third overall at the Sebring 12 Hours and won the Le Mans Endurance Series overall sharing an Audi R8 with Johnny Herbert. He also finished runner-up overall at the 24 Hours of Le Mans having set the fastest race lap and starting the race from Pole Position. In 2005 he raced as a Pirelli works driver guesting in the FIA GT Championship, driving at Spa and Bahrain in a Maserati MC12 GT1, setting the fastest lap in Spa and finishing runner-up overall in Bahrain, again setting the fastest race lap. In 2006, again as a Pirelli driver, he raced for Vitaphone Racing in the FIA GT Championship, driving a Maserati MC12 GT1 with several overall victories and podium finishes. In 2007, continuing with Pirelli, he raced in the series for Aston Martin Racing BMS Scuderia Italia. In 2008 he raced in the GT2 category of the series with Pirelli again, driving for Scuderia Ecosse.

Complete 24 Hours of Le Mans results

References

External links
Career statistics at Driver Database
Official website

Living people
1974 births
People from Yeovil
English racing drivers
EFDA Nations Cup drivers
British Formula Three Championship drivers
International Formula 3000 drivers
24 Hours of Le Mans drivers
FIA GT Championship drivers
British GT Championship drivers
American Le Mans Series drivers
European Le Mans Series drivers
24 Hours of Spa drivers
Aston Martin Racing drivers
Audi Sport drivers
David Price Racing drivers
DAMS drivers
Fortec Motorsport drivers
TOM'S drivers